Issak Fines-Leleiwasa (born 2 October 1995 in Australia) is an Australian rugby union player who plays for the Western Force in Super Rugby. His playing position is scrum-half. He has signed for the Western Force squad in 2022.

Reference list

External links
Rugby.com.au profile
itsrugby.co.uk profile

1995 births
Australian rugby union players
Living people
Rugby union scrum-halves
Rugby union wings
Queensland Country (NRC team) players
Brisbane City (rugby union) players
Western Force players
ACT Brumbies players
Rugby union players from Sydney